William Douglas Porter (September 9, 1932 – December 3, 2013) was an American salesman, who worked for Watkins Incorporated based out of Winona, Minnesota. Born with cerebral palsy, Porter's background and work was brought to the public's attention in 1995 when an Oregon-based newspaper published a series of feature stories about him.

Porter was born in San Francisco, California, and at a young age moved to Portland, Oregon along with his mother. He was unable to gain employment due to his cerebral palsy, but refused to go on disability. Porter eventually convinced Watkins Incorporated to give him a door-to-door salesman job, selling its products on a seven-mile route in the Portland area. He eventually became Watkins' top seller, and worked for the company for over forty years.

In 1995, the newspaper The Oregonian ran a feature story about Porter. The story of his optimistic determination made him the subject of media attention across the United States. He was featured in Reader's Digest and on ABC's 20/20. The 20/20 broadcast received over 2000 phone calls and letters, which was the most ever for a 20/20 story. Porter was the subject of a 2002 made-for-TV movie on TNT called Door to Door, featuring William H. Macy, Kyra Sedgwick and Helen Mirren. In 2009 the Japanese TBS network aired a TV movie loosely based on Bill Porter, also called Door to Door. It starred Ninomiya Kazunari and Rosa Kato as fictional versions of Porter and Brady. Porter died of an infection in Gresham, Oregon, on December 3, 2013, at the age of 81.

References

Further reading
 Brady, Shelly; Macy, William H. (2002) Ten Things I Learned From Bill Porter. New World Library,

External links
Bill Porter at Watkins Incorporated

1932 births
2013 deaths
20th-century American businesspeople
American salespeople
Businesspeople from Portland, Oregon
People associated with direct selling
People from Gresham, Oregon
People with cerebral palsy